TV Novel: Love, My Love is a 2012 South Korean television series starring Hwang Sun-hee, Song Min-jung, Oh Chang-seok and Kim San-ho. The morning soap opera aired on KBS2 on May 7, 2012 to January 4, 2013 from Mondays to Fridays at 09:00 for 175 episodes. It is a part of the KBS TV Novel.

Cast

Main characters
Hwang Sun-hee as Hong Seung-hee
Song Min-jung as Hong Seung-ah
Oh Chang-seok as Park No-kyung
Kim San-ho as Kang Tae-bum

Supporting characters
Damiul family
Kim Young-ok as Lee Geum-nyeo (grandmother)
Sunwoo Jae-duk as Hong Yoon-shik (father)
Kim Ye-ryeong as Kim Yang-ja (mother)
Kim Hyo-won as Lee Geum-dong (uncle)
Kim Joo-yeob as Hong Seung-goo (son)
Kwon Oh-hyun as Kim Chun-bong

Saekohreum family
Lee Il-hwa as Choi Myung-joo
Kim Sukok as Mrs. Yoo
Han Min-chae as Kim Yang
Lee Ji-eun as Bang Gob-dan
Jung Seung-ho as Shim Sang-chul
Kim Ju-hyeon as Shim Yun-ho

Hope Hospital family
Kim Kyu-chul as Yeo Sam-choo
Kim Bo-mi as Kim Mal-nyeon
Kang Min-ah as Yeo Eui-joo
Jang Da-kyung as Choi Min-young

Awards
2012 KBS Drama Awards: Excellence Award, Actress in a Daily Drama - Kim Ye-ryeong
2012 20th Korean Culture and Entertainment Awards: Best New Actor in a TV Drama - Oh Chang-seok

See also
Korean Broadcasting System

References

External links
Love, My Love official KBS website 

Korean Broadcasting System television dramas
2012 South Korean television series debuts
2013 South Korean television series endings
Korean-language television shows
South Korean romance television series